Hochsauerlandkreis is an electoral constituency (German: Wahlkreis) represented in the Bundestag. It elects one member via first-past-the-post voting. Under the current constituency numbering system, it is designated as constituency 147. It is located in eastern North Rhine-Westphalia, comprising the district of Hochsauerlandkreis.

Hochsauerlandkreis was created for the 1980 federal election. Since 2021, it has been represented by Friedrich Merz of the Christian Democratic Union (CDU).

Geography
Hochsauerlandkreis is located in eastern North Rhine-Westphalia. As of the 2021 federal election, it is coterminous with the Hochsauerlandkreis district.

History
Hochsauerlandkreis was created in 1980. In the 1980 through 1998 elections, it was constituency 119 in the numbering system. From 2002 through 2009, it was number 148. Since 2013, it has been number 147. Its borders have not changed since its creation.

Members
The constituency has been held continuously by the Christian Democratic Union (CDU) since its creation. It was first represented by Ferdinand Tillmann from 1980 to 1994. Friedrich Merz was representative from 1994 to 2009. Patrick Sensburg was elected in 2009, and re-elected in 2013 and 2017. Former member Merz successfully sought election again in 2021.

Election results

2021 election

2017 election

2013 election

2009 election

References

Federal electoral districts in North Rhine-Westphalia
1980 establishments in West Germany
Constituencies established in 1980
Hochsauerlandkreis